Aktiv Was trademark of Swedish Aktiv Maskin Östersund ltd. Company started producing agriculture machines and tracked vehicles. Company sold agriculture division to Electrolux and focused to tracked vehicles in 1980. Company stopped working in 1991.

Aktiv started making tracked vehicles 1957 when they started making Snow Trac, a small personal Snowcat that is roughly the size of a modern compact car. Aktiv started making small snowmobiles in 1973 when they bought Snö-Tric brand. First dual-Trac snowmobile made by Aktiv was Snö-Tric Blå 75- and  SC 20/2 75-.

Snowmobiles
Sno-Tric Gul 73-
Sno-Tric Röd 73-
Sno-Tric Blå 75-   (dual-track snowmobile)
SC 20/2 75-        (dual-track snowmobile)
Aktiv 600 75-
Aktiv Grizzly  (dual-track snowmobile)
Aktiv Grizzly De Luxe 82-89
Aktiv Grizzly XP 89-91
Aktiv Panther
Aktiv Karibo
Aktiv Alaska

External links
  Teo Lehtimäki ltd:n Aktiv leaflet 1973-1991.pdf

Tracked vehicles
Snowmobile brands